Dominga Sotomayor Castillo (born 1985) is a Chilean filmmaker.

Biography 
She graduated from Universidad Católica de Chile with a degree on Audiovisual Direction in 2007, followed by a Master at the Escola de Cinema y Audiovisuals de Catalunya (ESCAC) in Film direction. She directed several short films that were shown at festivals internationally. Her first feature film, Thursday Till Sunday (De jueves a domingo) was developed as part of the program La Résidence by Cinéfondation / Festival de Cannes, and premiered at International Film Festival Rotterdam, where it was awarded the Hivos Tiger Award.

In 2014, her 60 min film Mar premiered at the Forum section at Berlinale.

Her next feature Too late to die young (Tarde para morir joven), premiered at Locarno Film Festival, where she was awarded the Leopard for Best Direction. Dominga Sotomayor is the first ever woman to win this award.

She was one of the seven directors of the feature film The year of the everlasting storm, alongside Jafar Panahi, Anthony Chen, Malik Vitthal, Laura Poitras, David Lowery and Apichatpong Weerasethakul. The film premiered at Cannes' Special Screenings in 2021.

Over the past few years Dominga has also taught film courses ang gave talk in Chile and abroad and made videos and photographs for exhibitions, like "Little Sun" (Olafur Eliasson, 2012) at the Tate Modern in London. 

Recently she was one of he artist working for the Chilean Pavilion at the Biennale Art exhibition that opened in April 2022. 

She's been part of Berlinale Talents in 2009, and was a guest lecturer at Harvard University's Department of Art, Film, and Visual Studies in 2020-23.

Select filmography
 Cessna (short film, 2005)
 Noviembre (short film, 2007)
 Debajo (short film, 2007)
 La montana (short film, 2008)
 Videojuego (short film, 2008)
 Thursday Till Sunday (2012)
 Mar (2014)
 Los Barcos (short film, 2016)
 Too Late to Die Young (2018)
Correspondencia (short film, 2020 co-directed with Carla Simón)
 The year of the everlasting storm (2021)

References

External links

Chilean film directors
Chilean women film directors
Living people
1986 births